Minton is a hamlet in Shropshire, England.

It is located in the parish of Church Stretton, 2½ miles southwest of the market town of Church Stretton. A historic settlement, it is situated on a foothill of the Long Mynd at around 240m above sea level. As of 2010, there are around 12 dwellings in the hamlet.

Three lanes lead out from the hamlet: one to the A49 road, one mile southeast at Marshbrook; another lane leads to the hamlet of Hamperley, which is also in Church Stretton parish; and Little Stretton is one mile to the northeast.

History and features
The place name is from Welsh mynydd meaning 'hill' and Old English tun meaning 'settlement', 'town'. The hamlet has largely retained its Anglo-Saxon layout, with a patchwork of plots and haphazard narrow lanes. There are remains of a motte, which dates from either Anglo-Saxon or Norman times. It was a township and Royal manor, held by King Edward prior to the Norman conquest. It is mentioned in the Domesday Book.

Today the hamlet consists of farms and cottages and is agricultural in character. It is designated a conservation area and there are 5 Listed buildings in the hamlet – Long Mynd House, Ivanhoe, Manor Farmhouse, Well Cottage, and Minton House.

There is an outdoors activity centre located on the lane between Minton and Hamperley, the Longmynd Adventure Camp, with overnight accommodation and camping ground.

Minton Hill and Batch
Minton Hill is to the northwest of the hamlet and rises to 453m. A bridleway leads up to its summit (and continues beyond onto the Long Mynd) from the hamlet of Minton. Another walking route up to the Long Mynd is via the Minton Batch, where a bridleway leads up from the lane to Hamperley.

Famous residents
The Oscar-nominated actor, Pete Postlethwaite, lived at Yew Tree Cottage in Minton for many years before moving to the village of More near Bishop's Castle. "I do love Shropshire," he was quoted as saying. "Whenever I get home, my shoulders drop by two inches. The only reason I’ve been able to do the things I’ve done is because I have my family and Shropshire to come home to. They’ve made everything else possible."

The Minton surname
The Shropshire surname of Minton originates from the name of the hamlet although resources seem to disagree as to its earliest occurrence. Some point to Jordan de Minton, who was mentioned in the Pipe Rolls of Northumberland in 1169. However, the Rev R W Eyton in his book, 'The Antiquities of Shropshire' identifies Walter de Miniton (later Walter de Muneton) as the first tenant of Minton or Muneton as the site was then known. Subsequent Mintons of note include Thomas Minton (English potter), John Minton (British artist), Yvonne Minton (Australian opera singer), Mary Minton (novelist) and Sherman Minton (US Democratic senator).

Popular culture
Film:
The titular character of the movie, 'Big Stan' starring Rob Schneider was named Stan Minton. The characters of Conrad and Wilma Minton (played by Lew Ayres and Herta Ware) also appeared in the episode, 'Old Flames' in 1980s crime drama, 'Cagney and Lacey'.

Literature:
A series of children's books called, 'Minton Goes...' has been written by Anna Fienberg and Kim Gamble. A character called Sophia Minton also appeared in Agatha Christie's book, 'N or M?'.

The fictional airfield of RAF Minton featured in 'The Shepherd' by Frederick Forsyth while the village of Little Minton was invented by Enid Blyton for her book, 'The Mystery of the Secret Room'. The fictional town of Minton, New England also provided the setting for the 1860 novel, 'The Ebony Idol' by G M Flanders.

See also
Listed buildings in Church Stretton

References

Church Stretton
Villages in Shropshire